Sarfo is a surname. Notable people with the surname include:

Daniel Sarfo, Ghanaian Anglican bishop
Gloria Sarfo, Ghanaian actress and TV presenter
Kingsley Sarfo (born 1995), Ghanaian footballer
Margaret Sarfo (1957–2014), Ghanaian author and journalist
Samuel Sarfo (born 1990), Ghanaian footballer